Alaminos is a municipality in the province of Guadalajara, Castile-La Mancha, Spain. The municipality has 19.50 km2 and a population of 70 inhabitants, according to the 2013 census (INE).

References

Municipalities in the Province of Guadalajara